Carl G. Cromwell (January 26, 1889 – September 27, 1931) was a Texas oil driller and aviation pioneer.

Background
Carl G. Cromwell was born the oldest of six children to Swedish immigrants John Nels Cromwell and Hannah Anderson, in Saybrook, Warren County, Pennsylvania. Cromwell took an oilfield job at age sixteen. He worked in oil fields in Pennsylvania, Illinois, and Oklahoma, developing into a knowledgeable driller. After service with the 358th Infantry at Camp Travis in San Antonio, Texas, during World War I, he married Luella Lundsford in 1919. They moved to Texas, where Cromwell drilled around Burkburnett and other Texas oilfields.

Career
In 1921, Texon Oil and Land Company contracted with Cromwell to drill in Reagan County on land owned by the University of Texas. On May 28, 1923, the Santa Rita No. 1 came in and produced great wealth for the University of Texas. Cromwell became drilling superintendent of the Texon Company's expanding field around the camp of Santa Rita. In December 1928, the Reagan County discovery well came in at 8,525 feet. At that time the Santa Rita University 1-B was the world's deepest well.

Cromwell was also an aviation pioneer. On November 1, 1929, he launched Cromwell Airlines, an airline service between San Angelo and Dallas, Fort Worth, and San Antonio. While on a business trip in 1931, he was killed in an automobile accident near Sheffield, Pennsylvania.

References

Other sources
Carlson, Erik. Carl Cromwell, Cromwell Airlines, and the Dawn of Commercial Aviation in West Texas, 1928-1930 (West Texas Historical Association Yearbook, 2003).
 Presley, James. Saga of Wealth; The Rise of the Texas Oilmen (Austin: Texas Monthly Press, 1983; orig. pub. by Putnam, New York, 1978).
 Myres, Samuel D. The Permian Basin: Petroleum Empire of the Southwest (2 vols., El Paso, TX: Permian, 1973).
 Schwettmann, Martin W. Santa Rita: The University of Texas Oil Discovery (Austin: Texas State Historical Association, 1943).

American people of Swedish descent
People from Warren County, Pennsylvania
People from Wichita County, Texas
1880s births
1931 deaths
American Lutherans
Aviation pioneers
People in the petroleum industry
20th-century Lutherans